Nicholi Rogatkin (born December 21, 1995) is an American professional bike rider from Lincoln, Massachusetts, United States. Currently ranked #2 in the World. 2016 World Champion and 2018 Triple Crown Winner. The winningest FMB World Tour athlete with over 25 wins.

Career
Rogatkin started riding BMX at the age of five and became a professional at age 13. Rogatkin won the ASA Triples in Miami and BMX Dirt Worlds in 2013. In 2014, he focused more on mountain biking, and rode the FMB World Tour as a rookie.  In the 2015 season, he placed second at Crankworx Rotorua and Crankworx Whistler and became the first rider ever to win both the Best Trick Competition and the main event at Vienna Air King in Vienna, Austria.  
 Nicholi pulled the World's First Cashroll on a Downhill bike. In 2016 Rogatkin did a new trick and named it the Twister. The "Twister" is best described as a 1080 front flip, or a front cork 1080. Rogatkin finished 2016 season in First Place in the Freeride Mountain Bike World Tour Diamond Series and First Place in FISE World Series. In 2017 Rogatkin added another rotation to his own Twister (1080) and landed 1440 while competing at District Ride In Nuremberg, Germany.

On August 18, 2018, Nicholi was the first to win the “Triple Crown” of Crankworx Slopestyle after winning at Innsbruck, Austria, Les Gets, France, and Whistler in British Columbia. In 2019, he helped do motion capture for the Riders Republic video game along with Fabio Wibmer and Tomas Lemoine.

Wins
2013
 1st BMX Worlds Dusseldorf, Germany
 1st ASA Triples Miami, FL
 1st OMarisquino Vigo, Spain
2014
 1st 26 Trix Leogang, Austria
 1st OMarisquino, Vigo, Spain  
 1st OMarisquino Best Trick Vigo, Spain
2015
 1st Panasonic Best Trick Contest - Vienna Air King 
 1st Vienna Air King Austria
 1st Best Trick 26 Trix Leogang, Austria
 1st OMarisquino  Vigo, Spain
 1st GlemmRide Slopestyle Saalbach, Austria
 1st Bike Days Solothurn, Switzerland
2016
 1st Air to the Throne  London, GB
 1st Air to the Throne  Best Trick
 1st ATs Showdown  Best Trick Santa Rosa, CA
 1st Swatch Rocket Air Thun, Switzerland 
 1st Best Trick Crankworx Les Gets, France 
 1st Swatch Primeline Munich, Germany 
 1st Åre Video Challenge Åre, Sweden
 1st Red Bull Sky Gate Slope Style Zhangjiajie, China
 1st EuroBike Progression Session, Friedrichshafen, Germany
 1st EuroBike Team Battle, Friedrichshafen, Germany
 1st FISE World Chengdu, China
 1st 2016 FMB World Tour 
 1st 2016 FISE World Series
2017
 1st Air to the Throne  London, Great Britain 
 1st Crankworx Rotorua Slopestyle in Memory of McGazza, Rotorua, NZ
 1st Swatch Rocket Air Team Battle (North America), Thun, Switzerland 
 1st Swatch Rocket Air, Thun, Switzerland 
 1st Bike Days, Solothurn, Switzerland 
 1st 26Trix Best Trick Leogang, Austria
 1st Crankworx Innsbruck, Austria
 1st Colorado Freeride Festival, Winter Park, Colorado, USA
 1st O'Marisquino  Vigo, Spain
 1st District Ride Best Trick Nuremberg, Germany
 1st District Ride Nuremberg, Germany
 1st FISE World, Edmonton, Canada
 1st Happy Ride, Barcelona, Spain
2018
 1st Best Trick DarkFest, Stellenbosch, South Africa
 1st Swatch Rocket Air Team Battle (North America), Thun, Switzerland
 1st Bike Days, Solothurn, Switzerland
 1st FISE World Montpellier, France
 1st Crankworx Innsbruck, Austria 
 1st Crankworx Les Gets, France
 1st Big White Invitational, BC Canada
 1st Crankworx Whistler, BC Canada
 Triple Crown of Slopestyle Winner
2019
 1st Swatch Rocket Air Team Battle (North America), Thun, Switzerland
 1st Bike Days Solothurn, Switzerland
 1st Crankworx Best trick, Whistler, Canada
 1st Backwoods Jam Best Trick BC, Canada
1st Audi Nines Slope Bike Best Trick, Birkenfeld
2021
 1st Best Trick, Freeride Fiesta, Guadalajara Mexico
 1st Best Trick, Red Bull Copenride, Copenhagen, Danmark 
 1st Best Trick, Red Bull Roof Ride, Katowice, Poland
2022
 2nd District Ride Nuremberg, Germany
 1st Crankworx Cairns, Australia

References

http://Rogatkin'scrash-TheGnarliestCrashinRedBullRampageHistory

http://TheTwister

American male cyclists
1995 births
American mountain bikers
BMX riders
Living people